The Chicotte River (French: Rivière Chicotte) is a tributary of the Gulf of Saint Lawrence, flowing in the municipality of L'Île-d'Anticosti, in the Minganie Regional County Municipality, in the administrative region of North Shore, in province of Quebec, in Canada.

A forest road (north–south direction) serves the west side of this valley and another on the east side; these roads connect to the south the coastal road of the island (east–west direction). These roads are mainly used for forestry and recreational tourism activities.

Forestry is the main economic activity in this area, particularly through Anticosti National Park which covers the upper part of the river; recreational tourism activities, second.

Geography 
The Chicotte River draws its source from a mountain stream, located in the south-central part of the island. This source is located in a forest area at:
  east of the town center of the village of Port-Menier;
  south of the north shore of Anticosti Island;
  northeast of the south shore of Anticosti Island.

From its source, the Chicotte River descends between the Rivière aux Rats (located on the west side) and the Rivière aux Plats (east side).

  first to the south to a bend in the river corresponding to a stream (coming from the northwest); then towards the south-east in an increasingly deep valley, collecting a stream (coming from the north), until the discharge (coming from the north) of a small river;
  first to the southeast in a deep valley until a bend in the river; towards the south curving towards the south-east; passing under the forest road bridge that runs along the southern coast of Anticosti Island; by crossing the Petit canyon Chicotte and passing in front of the locality Chicotte la Mer at the end of the segment, to its mouth.

The Chicotte River empties on the south shore of Anticosti Island, in the Gulf of Saint Lawrence, on the west side of Cap des Caps.

Toponymy 
The toponymic designation "Chicotte River" appears on an 1856 map of Anticosti Island by geologist James Richardson. The spelling "Chicotte" derives from the English pronunciation of the French word "chicot", meaning debris of trees or shrubs.

The toponym “rivière Chicotte” was made official on December 5, 1968.

Recreational tourism activities 
A path allows you to contemplate nature on the south shore, between the limit of the national park and the course of the river.

See also 
 Minganie Regional County Municipality
 L'Île-d'Anticosti, a Municipality
 Anticosti Island, an island
 Anticosti National Park
 Honguedo Strait
 Gulf of Saint Lawrence
 List of rivers of Quebec

References

External links 
 

Rivers of Côte-Nord
Anticosti Island
Minganie Regional County Municipality